Curtis is a nationally syndicated comic strip written and illustrated by Ray Billingsley, with a predominantly African American cast. The comic strip started up on October 3, 1988, and is syndicated by King Features.

The comic strip portrays the daily life of a middle-class Black family living in a large American city, especially that of Curtis, the eponymous main character. It frequently chronicles aspects of African American culture and history.

Though Billingsley grew up mainly in New York City and still resides in the greater New York area, the strip long hinted at being set in Washington, D.C. This was essentially confirmed in 2009 when several characters attended the inauguration of Barack Obama without needing to travel.

Curtis has been compared to Li'l Abner, which Billingsley cites as his favorite comic strip, in style.

Themes 
A recurring theme is Curtis' efforts to convince his father to give up smoking, a personal issue for Billingsley, who is a prominent advocate for public health and the dangers of smoking. For his efforts in educating young people about smoking, Billingsley has earned multiple awards from the American Lung Association.

Though a fundamentally humorous comic, Curtis frequently addresses serious themes. Examples include bullying, drug addiction and gentrification. A storyline in 2020 involved the COVID-19 pandemic.

During the holiday season, Billingsley sometimes deviates from his usual characters to present special two-to-three week stories celebrating the Festival of Kwanzaa. Once an annual tradition in the strip, these specials became irregular in the mid-2010s, with Ray Billingsley citing declining reader interest in them. Similarly, around the Martin Luther King Jr. Day holiday, the strip will discuss some aspect of Dr. King's life. The month of February is also dedicated to Black History Month, in which Mrs. Nelson assigns her class to write about various African-American figures in history.

Characters
Curtis Wesley Wilkins - Main character, an 11-year-old boy. A rap fan with a huge crush on a girl named Michelle. He has a huge appetite and a talent for getting himself into trouble. Prior to 2020, he always wore an oversized green cap backwards and perched at an angle on the back of his head; according to the storyline, he got it at a young age from his father. In 2020, Michelle gave him a smaller green cap as a gift and he has worn that one ever since. 
Barry Taylor Wilkins - Curtis's younger brother. Their parents consider Barry to be the more trustworthy of the two, while Curtis usually sees him as a brat. Their relationship is portrayed as friendly sibling rivalry. He also performs better in school, which makes Curtis jealous.
Greg Wilkins - Curtis's father. Works at the DMV and hates his job. He and Curtis are regularly at odds over their tastes in music (Curtis likes rap and hip-hop, and Greg can't stand it, preferring Motown), among other things (see below).
Diane Wilkins - Curtis's mother. A housewife, she tends to get irritated by Curtis's antics, but is always supportive of him when he has a problem. Originally sporting an afro, Diane has received two different hairstyle makeovers over the years. Diane and Greg met when they were featured dancers on Soul Train.
Mrs. Nelson - A middle-aged, overweight teacher. Since Curtis is the class joker, she doesn't get along very well with him. He does however do well when he makes an effort and when he thanks her for giving him a good grade, she tells him he earned it. She also tells his mother good things about him at the parent-teacher conferences. In 2020, Mrs. Nelson tested positive for COVID-19 but recovered.
Michelle Grant - A girl whom Curtis likes, even though she is two years older. Her father is rich. Considered self-centered (and egotistical) by most of the other characters, she only likes Curtis as a friend and discourages his attempts to date her (though she did finally agree to do so in a June–July 2007 series). She is an excellent singer and hopes to become a famous star, currently starring in energy drink commercials. In the October 10, 2007 strip, it is revealed that Michelle has a mother who has been admitted to rehab for treatment due to her problems with drug addiction.
Chutney Devoe - A girl who likes Curtis. Curtis only sees her as a friend, while he chases after Michelle. He does sometimes appear jealous of her other male friends, though.
Gunk - Curtis's cross-eyed Caucasian best friend. A native of the fictional Flyspeck Island, Gunk (an initialism for Gladimus Umfred Nostradamus Klaustauvicke) often gives some bizarre item to Curtis, with disastrous results (most often a chameleon). One of his quirks is his refusal to fight anybody, but he also is cat-like in his moves to avoid his nemesis's punches, because as he says afterwards, "just because I won't fight you doesn't mean I'm going to let you hit me."
Gunther - Runs the Soul Scissors Barber Shop. Asked if Gunther is his first or last name, he replies, "Yeah." Never gets Curtis' name right (but at least every attempt either starts with a "C" or a hard "C" sound), and who claims to know nearly every famous person (and who has photos – but always with a thumb covering the famous person).
Rose Petal, niece of Gunther, who enjoys singing, but she gets fired from every gig she enters, because she has a foul mouth and a really bad attitude. She refuses to work for money she needs to "pay for her rent" (although it is revealed that she really needs the money to party), and ultimately, Gunther throws her out of his shop out of "tough love". 
Derrick - A bully. He and his friend, "Onion", make fun of Curtis by calling him "Wimpkins" and using "yo momma jokes", and on occasion physically harass him (in one series, they attempted to falsely accuse him of criminal activity). One time Derrick put down Curtis' father as an "Oreo" for being steadily employed and running a nuclear family, but Curtis dismisses it when he learns of his parents' devotion to hearth and home. Curtis attempts to avoid them as much as possible. Gunk, Chutney and others have helped Curtis against the bullying of Derrick and "Onion". In a late 2010 strip, Derrick has a girlfriend named Veranda, who has an attitude like him and "Onion". In an earlier strip, Derrick was a rival for Michelle's affections, but she could not stand his boorish attitude.
"Onion" - Derrick's friend and fellow bully to Curtis. His real name is Norman, but is self-nicknamed "Onion" for being able to "bring tears to a sucker's eyes."
"Ms. Honeystump" - Curtis's summer-school teacher. The gag is that she's attractive, and therefore distracting to the students.
"Mr. Kwame" - Michelle's Teacher whom she is madly in love with. The gag is while Curtis fawns over her in his presence she completely ignores his passes while dreaming about him.
"Heart-Throb" - An overweight friend of Curtis whose real name is Anthony Caldwell. He is polite and tells adults what they want to hear but doesn't mean what he says.
"Tiny" - Gunther's very large nephew who everyone believes is going to college on a football scholarship but is really receiving an academic scholarship and studying to be a lawyer.
"Tomaura" - Michelle's cousin who looks like her.

Recurring gags
Barry is almost always listening in on either phone or live conversations between Curtis and Michelle which annoys Curtis. A frequent running gag in the strip, each time this happens it starts with Barry saying something offensive about Michelle, which causes Curtis to chase after him. Barry runs to Diane, saying "Mama, Curtis is trying to hit me for no good reason!" Curtis responds by saying "Don't fall for his 'innocent little boy' routine, Mom," and begins to explain what Barry did. More often that not, Diane does not believe Curtis and usually gives Barry ice cream to calm him while scolding Curtis and sending him off to do chores. On a couple of occasions, Barry even confesses to having listened to the conversations (asking what does a certain phrase mean, or even offering to repeat what Curtis said).  This prompts questions from some over whether Diane properly punishes him for lying and eavesdropping.
Greg Wilkins is a heavy smoker, a habit he picked up in childhood and has apparently little desire to break as it apparently helps him cope with life. Curtis is not happy with his father's smoking and tries at various points to make him quit, including by trying to shame him for having to stop at the grocery store in the rain with no umbrella just so he could purchase cigarettes (which backfires when Greg tells Curtis the purpose of the trip was to buy liver for dinner, which Curtis hates) and by purposely breaking his cigarettes in front of Greg, which causes him to chase Curtis around the house.  Each exchange between Curtis and Greg about Greg's smoking usually begins with Curtis making a remark, followed by Greg's retort, "Don't start, Curtis!" One time Curtis had tried to break his father of the habit through hypnosis, and associating cigarettes with disgusting comparisons, causing Barry to remark "If you fail at this, be glad at least you convinced me to never smoke!"
Another recurring theme involves Curtis' favorite comic book superhero Supercaptaincoolman. The strip reads like a comic book in most part where Supercaptaincoolman engages in many types of adventures in his daily struggle to rid the world of his arch nemesis, The Evil Dr. Horsehead.  But just as the action is about to heat up, the third to last panel suddenly shows Ms. Nelson shouting, "Mr. Wilkins!!" as she catches Curtis reading his comics while he is supposed to be paying attention in class while he gulps and says "Ms. Nelson!" He immediately tries to get out of the situation by lying.  The last panel shows Curtis being sent to the principal's office as punishment for reading comic books in class.
Once in a while, Curtis and Barry, just before church services begin, will observe ladies coming in wearing elaborate hats on their heads.  Curtis will promptly make jokes about each hat they are wearing as they pass by the pew that Curtis and Barry are sitting in, while Barry tries not to laugh too loud.  In the last panel, while Curtis is laughing over his ladies' hat jokes, Barry will typically warn Curtis about big trouble coming to him if they ever heard him make insulting jokes about their hats (ironically, in one such strip, there were also two elderly men who mock the women's hats in exactly the same manner as Curtis and Barry do, causing Barry to worry even more as to what they might end up as).
One recurring theme always involves Curtis and someone else (often Barry, but occasionally Gunk) entering some establishment with a name like "The Don King School of Personal Etiquette" or "The Mike Tyson Institute of Good Mannerism", then finding out it's really a music store. Curtis explains that "it's really my favorite record store in disguise" and that "every time the parents and the locals find out its real identity; they torch it!", apparently due to the type of music it sells (usually rap music featuring an artist with a rap sheet). The store's proprietor is a man from a Caribbean nation (presumably Jamaica) who wears dreadlocks and a Rastafarian cap. He treats Curtis like his best customer, making statements such as he got a shipment in just for him, or when Curtis cannot believe that a hard-to-find album is for sale, the owner responds akin to "Of course! Would I lie to the little prince?" This theme has been featured less since the advent of iTunes.
Another recurring theme is the first day of school strip where the reader sees the city in the first panel. Then, the next two panels of the view brings the reader to where Curtis lives. The first three strips warn the reader about something that very disturbing is happening at this time of the morning, whether it is a skirmish or some other type of war. After being warned about what's to come in the third panel, the reader will then be taken to the last panel where the actual event takes place—Diane forcing Curtis to get out of bed to get ready for school while Curtis would rather stay in bed and sleep away.

References

External links
Curtis
Toonopedia

African-Americans in comic strips
Child characters in comics
Male characters in comics
Comics about married people
Comic strips set in the United States
1988 comics debuts
Slice of life comics
Comics characters introduced in 1988